Jérôme Simon (born 5 December 1960 in Troyes) is a French professional road bicycle racer. Jérôme Simon is the brother of cyclists Pascal Simon, François Simon and Régis Simon.

Major results

1988
Briénon
Puy l'Evêque
GP de Cannes
Tour de France:
Winner stage 9
Winner Combativity award
1989
Grand Prix du Midi Libre
1991
Route Adélie de Vitré

External links 

French male cyclists
1960 births
Living people
French Tour de France stage winners
Sportspeople from Troyes
Cyclists from Grand Est